Audrey Whitby (born April 10, 1996) is an American actress. She is known for her many appearances on AwesomenessTV including starring in the cast of Betch: A Sketch Show, and for her recurring roles as Audrey Vale on the Disney Channel sketch comedy spinoff series So Random! and as Cherry on the Nickelodeon television comedy series The Thundermans.

Career
Whitby started acting when she was six in community theater and started auditioning in Chicago when she was eight. Whitby moved to Los Angeles when she was 12.

Whitby's first major role was on the Disney Channel program So Random! She later appeared on the Disney Channel series Liv and Maddie, and then played the long-time recurring character of Cherry on the Nickelodeon television series The Thundermans. Whitby worked for AwesomenessTV, including in its television series of the same name, its Terry the Tomboy film, and its followup comedy sketch series Betch: A Sketch Show, which also stars her sister Madeline and which was released on go90. In 2017 she co-starred on the AwesomenessTV drama series In the Vault which was also released on go90.

Personal life
Whitby was born in Murfreesboro, Tennessee, and raised in Granger, Indiana.  Her sister is Madeline Whitby, who is also an actress.

In 2016, Whitby joined in an anti-Trump protest which led to her and those involved getting arrested by police officers.

Filmography

References

External links
 
 

1996 births
Living people
American television actresses
21st-century American actresses
People from Murfreesboro, Tennessee
American child actresses
American film actresses
Actresses from Tennessee
People from Granger, Indiana
Actresses from Indiana